Lázně Libverda is a spa municipality and village in Liberec District in the Liberec Region of the Czech Republic. It has about 400 inhabitants.

Etymology
The original German name Liebenwerde is an abbreviation of auf dem Lieben werde, which then meant "on a lovely island". The Czech name was created by transcription.

Geography
It borders Poland in the east.

Lázně Libverda lies in the Jizera Mountains. Part of the Jizerskohorské bučiny National Nature Reserve is located in the southern part of the municipal territory. The Libverdský Creek flows through the municipality.

History

The first written mention of Lázně Libverda is from 1381, when it was part of the Frýdlant estate.

Spa
The healing power of the local spring was first mentioned in 1601 in a report, which stated that the healing effects were known by pilgrims already at the end of the 14th century. In 1785, a new big spring was uncovered, and between 1786 and 1818, several other spring were uncovered. In 1952, the last two spa springs, Kyselka and Nový vrt, were drilled.

Twin towns – sister cities

Lázně Libverda is twinned with:
 Mirsk, Poland
 Świeradów-Zdrój, Poland
 Trzebiel, Poland

References

External links

Libverda Spa

Spa towns in the Czech Republic
Villages in Liberec District